Tuscumbia City School District  is a school district in Colbert County, Alabama.

External links
 

Education in Colbert County, Alabama